Celluloid Heroes is a play by David Williamson about the Australian film industry. It was written to celebrate the tenth anniversary of the Nimrod Theatre and is not one of his highly regarded plays. 

Williamson later called it:
A bad play which didn't create characters that were complex enough to last the distance after interval. Part of the problem was that I felt I was writing to order... and I was supposed to be writing something light and bright and happy, but my feelings about the film industry were anything but light and bright. I think I let my personal bile about the indignities writers suffer in the film industry, and how basically shoddy it all is, spill over into the play. I wasn't sufficiently objective and I made the characters overly evil or two-dimensional...  [it] was simply social satire dipped into crude farce. Not one of my best efforts... It's the only time I've worked to a commission and it's the only time I've been ashamed of the final product.
He later wrote about the Australian film industry far more successfully in Emerald City.

References

External links

1980 plays
Plays by David Williamson
English-language plays